The Jagannath Temple is an important Hindu temple dedicated to Jagannath, a form of Vishnu – one of the trinity of supreme divinity in Hinduism. Puri is in the state of Odisha, on the eastern coast of India. The present temple was rebuilt from the tenth century onwards, on the site of pre-existing temples in the compound but not the main Jagannatha temple, and begun by Anantavarman Chodaganga, the first king of the Eastern Ganga dynasty.

The Puri temple is famous for its annual Ratha Yatra, or chariot festival, in which the three principal deities are pulled on huge and elaborately decorated temple cars. Unlike the stone and metal icons found in most Hindu temples, the image of Jagannath (which gave its name to the English term 'juggernaut') is made of wood and is ceremoniously replaced every twelve or 19 years by an exact replica. It is one of the Char Dham pilgrimage sites.

The temple is sacred to all Hindus, and especially in those of the Vaishnava traditions. Many great Vaishnava saints, such as Ramanujacharya, Madhvacharya, Nimbarkacharya, Vallabhacharya and Ramananda were closely associated with the temple. Ramanuja established the Emar Mutt near the temple and Adi Shankaracharya established the Govardhan Math, which is the seat of one of the four Shankaracharyas. It is also of particular significance to the followers of Gaudiya Vaishnavism, whose founder, Chaitanya Mahaprabhu, was attracted to the deity, Jagannath, and lived in Puri for many years.

History 

The temple was rebuilt by the Ganga dynasty king Anantavarman Chodaganga in the 10th century CE, as suggested by the Kendupatna copper-plate inscription of his descendant Narasimhadeva II. Anantavarman was originally a Shaivite, and became a Vaishnavite sometime after he conquered the Utkala region (in which the temple is located) in 1112 CE. A 1134–1135 CE inscription records his donation to the temple. Therefore, the temple construction must have started sometime after 1112 CE.

According to a story in the temple chronicles, it was founded by Anangabhima-deva II: different chronicles variously mention the year of construction as 1196, 1197, 1205, 1216, or 1226. This suggests that the temple's construction was completed or that the temple was renovated during the reign of Anantavarman's son Anangabhima. The temple complex was further developed during the reigns of the subsequent kings, including those of the Ganga dynasty and the Gajapati dynasty.

Deities
Jagannath, Balabhadra and Subhadra are a trio of deities worshipped at the temple. The inner sanctum of the temple contains the deities of them carved from sacred neem logs known as daru sitting on the bejewelled platform or ratnabedi, along with deities of Sudarshana Chakra, Madanmohan, Sridevi and Vishwadhatri. The deities are adorned with different clothing and jewels according to the season. Worship of these deities pre-dates the building of the temple and may have originated in an ancient tribal shrine.

Legends

According to legend, the construction of the first Jagannath temple was commissioned by King Indradyumna, son of Bharata and Sunanda, and a Malava king, mentioned in the Mahabharata and the Puranas.

The legendary account as found in the Skanda-Purana, Brahma Purana and other Puranas and later Odia works state that Lord Jagannath was originally worshipped as Lord Neela Madhaba by a Savar king (tribal chief) named Viswavasu. Having heard about the deity, King Indradyumna sent a Brahmin priest, Vidyapati to locate the deity, who was worshipped secretly in a dense forest by Viswavasu. Vidyapati tried his best but could not locate the place. But at last he managed to marry Viswavasu's daughter Lalita. At repeated request of Vidyapti, Viswavasu took his son-in-law blind folded to a cave where Lord Neela Madhaba was worshipped.

Vidyapati was very intelligent. He dropped mustard seeds on the ground on the way. The seeds germinated after a few days, which enabled him to find out the cave later on. On hearing from him, King Indradyumna proceeded immediately to Odra desha (Odisha) on a pilgrimage to see and worship the Deity. But the deity had disappeared. The king was disappointed. The Deity was hidden in sand. The king was determined not to return without having a darshan of the deity and observed fast unto death at Mount Neela, Then a celestial voice cried Thou shalt see him.  Afterward, the king performed a horse sacrifice and built a magnificent temple for Vishnu. Narasimha Murti brought by Narada was installed in the temple. During sleep, the king had a vision of Lord Jagannath. Also an astral voice directed him to receive the fragrant tree on the seashore and make deities out of it. Accordingly, the king got the image of Lord Jagannath, Balabhadra, Subhadra and Chakra Sudarshan made out of the wood of the divine tree and installed them in the temple.

Indradyumna's prayer to Lord Brahma

King Indradyumna put up for Jagannath the tallest monument of the world. It was 1,000 cubits high. He invited Lord Brahma, the cosmic creator, consecrate the temple and the images. Brahma came all the way from Heaven for this purpose. Seeing the temple he was immensely pleased with him. Brahma asked Indradyumna as to in what way can he (Brahma) fulfill the king's desire, since was very much pleased with him for his having put the most beautiful Temple for Lord Vishnu. With folded hands, Indradyumna said, "My Lord if you are really pleased with me, kindly bless me with one thing, and it is that I should be issueless and that I should be the last member of my family." In case anybody left alive after him, he would only take pride as the owner of the temple and would not work for the society.

Legend surrounding the Temple origin
The traditional story concerning the origins of the Lord Jagannath temple is that here the original image of Jagannath (a deity form of Vishnu) at the end of Dvapara yuga manifested near a banyan tree, near seashore in the form of an Indranila mani or the Blue Jewel.  It was so dazzling that it could grant instant moksha, so the God Dharma or Yama wanted to hide it in the earth and was successful. In Kali Yuga King Indradyumna of Malwa wanted to find that mysterious image and to do so he performed harsh penance to obtain his goal. Vishnu then instructed him to go to the Puri seashore and find a floating log to make an image from its trunk.

The King found the log of wood. He did a yajna from which God Yajna Nrisimha appeared and instructed that Narayana should be made as fourfold expansion, i.e. Paramatma as Vasudeva, his Vyuha as Samkarshana, Yogamaya as Subhadra, and his Vibhava as Sudarsana. Vishwakarma appeared in the form of an artisan and prepared images of Jagannath, Balabhadra and Subhadra from the tree.

When this log, radiant with light was seen floating in the sea, Narada told the king to make three deities out of it and place them in a pavilion. Indradyumna got Visvakarma, the architect of Gods, to build a magnificent temple to house the deities, and Vishnu himself appeared in the guise of a carpenter to make the deities on condition that he was to be left undisturbed until he finished the work.

But just after two weeks, the Queen became very anxious. She took the carpenter to be dead as no sound came from the temple. Therefore, she requested the king to open the door. Thus, they went to see Vishnu at work at which the latter abandoned his work leaving the deities unfinished. The deity was devoid of any hands. But a divine voice told Indradyumana to install them in the temple. It has also been widely believed that in spite of the deity being without hands, it can watch over the world and be its lord. Thus the idiom.

Invasions and desecrations of the Temple
The temple annals, the Madala Panji records that the Jagannath temple at Puri has been invaded and plundered eighteen times. In 1692, Mughal Emperor Aurangzeb ordered to close the temple until he wanted to reopen it otherwise it would be demolished, the local Mughal officials who came to carry out the job were requested by the locals and the temple was merely closed. It was re-opened only after Aurangzeb's death in 1707.

Entry and Darshan
Non-Hindus are not permitted to enter the temple. Visitors not allowed to enter may view the temple and precinct from the roof of the nearby Raghunandan Library and pay their respects to the image of God Jagannath seen at the main entrance to the temple.

The temple is open from 5:00 am to midnight. Unlike in many other temples, devotees can go around and behind the deities . During the special darshan, or parimanik darshan, devotees pay a small fee to go right up to the deities. All devotees are allowed to go right up to the deities during the sahana mela (general appearance) 7am-8:00 am without paying any fees.

Cultural integrity
Starting from Lord Jagannath himself, history has it that he was a tribal deity, adorned by the Sabar people, as a symbol of Narayan. Another legend claims him to be Nilamadhava, an image of Narayana made of blue stone and worshipped by the aboriginals. He was brought to Nilagiri (blue mountain) or Nilachala and installed there as Shri Jagannath in company with Balabhadra and Subhadra. The images made of wood are also claimed to have their distant linkage with the vanvasi (forest dwellers) system of worshipping wooden poles. To cap it all the Daitapatis, who have a fair share of responsibilities to perform rituals of the Temple, are claimed to be descendants of the hill tribes of Odisha. So we may safely claim that the beginning of the cultural history of Shrikshetra is found in the cultures of Hindu tribes. The three deities came to be claimed as the symbols of Samyak Darshan, Samyak Jnana and Samyak Charita usually regarded as Ratnatraya, triple gems of the Jain culture, assimilation of which leads to Omniscience and Moksha (salvation).

Jagannath is worshipped as Vishnu or Narayana or Krishna and Lord Balabhadra as Shesha. Simultaneously, the deities are regarded as the bhairava with Vimala (the devi or the consort of Shiva) installed in the campus of the temple. So ultimately we find a fusion of Saivism, Shaktism and Vaishnavism of the Hindu religion so reverently held together in Shrikshetra.

Acharyas and Jagannatha Puri
All of the renowned acharyas including Madhvacharya have been known to visit this kshetra. Adi Shankara established his Govardhana matha here. Guru Nanak had visited this place with his disciples Bala and Manda. Chaitanya Mahaprabhu of Gaudiya Vaishnavism stayed here for 24 years, establishing that the love of God can be spread by chanting the Hare Krishna mantra. Srimad Vallabhacharya Mahaprabhu visited Jagannath Puri and performed a 7-day recitation of Srimad Bhagvat. His sitting place is still famous as his "baithakji", roughly literally translating to his seat. It confirms his visit to Puri.

A famous incident took place when JagadGuru Acharya Srimad Vallabhacharya Mahaprabhu visited. There was a Shastrartha being held between the Brahmins before the king himself and 4 questions were asked. Who is the highest of Gods, What is the highest of mantras, What is the highest scripture and What is the highest service. The discourse went on for many days with many schools of thought. Very young teen Vallabhacharyaji Mahaprabhu also joined the debated and answered all the questions at once. His answers were accepted and appreciated by all except few opposition scholars, they challenged the answers. The debate then resumed for a long period.

Finally Shri Vallabhacharya said to ask Lord Jagannath to confirm Shri Vallabh's answers. It was mutually decided between all scholars and king that whatever Lord Jagannath would write, it would be considered as the final and correct answer.

A pen, inkpot and the paper were left alone in the inner sanctum before the deity to write the answers.

After some time, the doors were opened and 4 answers were found to be written. 1) The Son of Devaki (Krishna) is the God of Gods 2) His name is the highest of mantras 3) Highest of all scriptures is Devki Putra's Bhagavat Geeta 4) Service to Him is the Highest service.

The king along with all other scholars were shocked and declared Shri Vallabh the winner of the discourse.

Some of the pandits who participated became jealous of young Shri Vallabh and wanted to test Him. The next day was Ekadashi, a fasting day where one must fast from grains. The pandits gave Shri Vallabh rice Prasad of Shri Jagannathji (The temple is famous for this). If Shri Vallabh ate it, He would break His vow of fasting but if He did not take it, He would disrespect Lord Jagannath. Shri Vallabh with all honor and respect accepted the prasad in his hand. He stood there in the temple, spent the rest of the day and night explaining shlokas of the greatness of Prasad and ate the rice the next morning after sunrise.

The Sikh Aarti Gagan mai thaal was recited by first guru, Guru Nanak in 1506 or 1508 during his journey (called "udaasi") to east India, at the revered Jagannath Temple, Puri. This arti is sung (not performed with platter and lamps etc.) daily after recitation of Rehraas Sahib and Ardās at the Harmandir Sahib, Amritsar and at most Gurudwara sahibs.

Char Dham

The temple is one of the holiest Vaishnava Hindu Char Dham (four divine sites) sites also including Rameswaram, Badrinath, Puri and Dwarka. Though the origins are not clearly known, the Advaita school of Hinduism propagated by Sankaracharya, who created Hindu monastic institutions across India, attributes the origin of Char Dham to the seer. The four monasteries lie across the four corners of India and their attendant temples are Badrinath Temple at Badrinath in the North, Jagannath Temple at Puri in the East, Dwarakadheesh Temple at Dwarka in the West and Ramanathaswamy Temple at Rameswaram in the South.  Though ideologically the temples are divided between the sects of Hinduism, namely Saivism and Vaishnavism, the Char Dham pilgrimage is an all Hindu affair. There are four abodes in Himalayas called Chota Char Dham (Chota meaning small): Badrinath, Kedarnath, Gangotri and Yamunotri – all of these lie at the foothills of Himalayas The name Chota was added during the mid of 20th century to differentiate the original Char Dhams.  The journey across the four cardinal points in India is considered sacred by Hindus who aspire to visit these temples once in their lifetime. Traditionally the trip starts at the eastern end from Puri, proceeding in clockwise direction in a manner typically followed for circumambulation in Hindu temples.

Structure

Another wall known as kurma bedha surrounds the main temple. It contains at least 120 temples and shrines. With its sculptural richness and fluidity of the Oriya style of temple architecture, it is one of the most magnificent monuments of India. The temple has four distinct sectional structures, namely –
 Deula, Vimana or Garba griha (Sanctum sanctorum) where the triad deities are lodged on the ratnavedi (Throne of Pearls). In Rekha Deula style;
 Mukhashala (Frontal porch);
 Nata mandir/Natamandapa, which is also known as the Jagamohan (Audience Hall/Dancing Hall), and
 Bhoga Mandapa (Offerings Hall).
The main temple is a curvilinear temple and crowning the top is the 'Neelachakra' (an eight spoked wheel) of Lord Vishnu.It is made out of Ashtadhatu and is considered sacrosanct. Among the existing temples in Orissa, the temple of Shri Jagannath is the highest. The pyramidal roofs of the surrounding temples and adjoining halls, or mandapas, rise in steps toward the tower like a ridge of mountain peaks.

Nila Chakra
The Nila Chakra (Blue Discus) is the discus mounted on the top shikhar of the Jagannath Temple. As per custom, everyday a different flag is waved on the Nila Chakra. The flag hoisted on the Nila Chakra is called the Patita Pavana (Purifier of the Fallen) and is equivalent to the image of the deities placed in the sanctum sanctorum.

The Nila Chakra is a disc with eight Navagunjaras carved on the outer circumference, with all facing towards the flagpost above. It is made of alloy of eight metals (Asta-dhatu) and is 3.5 Metres (11 feet and 8 inches) high with a circumference of about 11 metres (36 feet). During the year 2010, the Nila Chakra was repaired and restored by the Archaeological Survey of India.

The Nila Chakra is distinct from the Sudarshana chakra which has been placed with the deities in the inner sanctorum.

Nila Chakra is the most revered iconic symbol in the Jagannath tradition. The Nila Chakra is the only physical object whose markings are used as sacrament and considered sacred in Jagannath worship. It symbolizes protection by Shri Jagannath.

The Singhadwara

The Singahdwara, which in Sanskrit means The Lion Gate, is one of the four gates to the temple and forms the Main entrance. The Singhadwara is so named because two huge statues of crouching lions exist on either side of the entrance. The gate faces east opening on to the Bada Danda or the Grand Road. The Baisi Pahacha or the flight of twenty two steps leads into the temple complex. An deity of Jagannath known as Patitapavana, which in Sanskrit, means the "Saviour of the downtrodden and the fallen" is painted on the right side of the entrance. In ancient times when untouchables were not allowed inside the temple, they could pray to Patita Pavana. The statues of the two guards to the temple Jaya and Vijaya stand on either side of the doorway. Just before the commencement of the Rath Yatra the deities of Jagannath, Balabhadra and Subhadra are taken out of the temple through this gate. On their return from the Gundicha Temple they have to ceremonially placate Goddess Mahalakshmi, whose deity is carved atop the door, for neglecting to take her with them on the Yatra. Only then the Goddess allows them permission to enter the temple. A magnificent sixteen-sided monolithic pillar known as the Aruna Stambha stands in front of the main gate. This pillar has an idol of Arun, the charioteer of the Sun God Surya, on its top. One significant thing about Arun stambha is that prior it was located in the Konark Sun temple, later, the Maratha guru Brahmachari Gosain brought this pillar from Konark.

Other entrances

Apart from the Singhadwara, which is the main entrance to the temple, there are three other entrances facing north, south and west. They are named after the sculptures of animals guarding them. The other entrances are the Hathidwara or the Elephant Gate, the Vyaghradwara or the Tiger Gate and the Ashwadwara or the Horse Gate.

Minor temples

There are numerous smaller temples and shrines within the Temple complex where active worship is regularly conducted. The Vimala Temple (Bimala Temple) is considered one of the most important of the Shaktipeeths marks the spot where the Goddess Sati's navel fell. It is located near Rohini Kund in the temple complex. Until food offered to Jagannath is offered to Goddess Vimala it is not considered Mahaprasad.

The temple of Mahalakshmi has an important role in rituals of the main temple. It is said that preparation of naivedya as offering for Jagannath is supervised by Mahalakshmi. The Kanchi Ganesh Temple is dedicated to Uchchhishta Ganapati. Tradition says the King of Kanchipuram (Kanchi) in ancient times gifted the deity, when Gajapati Purushottama Deva married Padmavati, the kanchi princess. There are other shrines namely Muktimandap, Surya, Saraswati, Bhuvaneshwari, Narasimha, Rama, Hanuman and Eshaneshwara.

The Mandapas

There are many Mandapas or Pillared halls on raised platforms within the temple complex meant for religious congregations. The most prominent is the Mukti Mandapa the congregation hall of the holy seat of selected learned Brahmins.

Here important decisions regarding conduct of daily worship and festivals are taken. The Dola Mandapa is noteworthy for a beautifully carved stone Torana or arch which is used for constructing a swing for the annual Dol Yatra festival. During the festival the deity of Dologobinda is placed on the swing. The Snana Bedi is a rectangular stone platform where deities of Jagannath, Balabhadra and Subhadra are placed for ceremonial bathing during the annual Snana Yatra.

Daily food offerings

Daily offerings are made to the Lord six times a day. These include:
 The offering to the Lord in the morning that forms his breakfast and is called Gopala Vallabha Bhoga. Breakfast consists of seven items i.e. Khua, Lahuni, Sweetened coconut grating, Coconut water, and popcorn sweetened with sugar known as Khai, Curd and Ripe bananas.
 The Sakala Dhupa forms his next offering at about 10 AM. This generally consists of 13 items including the Enduri cake & Mantha puli.
 Bada Sankhudi Bhoga forms the next repast & the offering consists of Pakhala with curd and Kanji payas. The offerings are made in the Bhog Mandapa, about 200 feet from the Ratnabedi. This is called Chatra Bhog and was introduced by Adi Shankaracharya in the eighth century to help pilgrims share the temple food.
 The Madhyanha dhupa forms the next offering at the noon.
 The next offering to the Lord is made in the evening at around 8 PM it is Sandhya Dhupa.
 The last offering to the Lord is called the Bada Simhara Bhoga.

The Mahaprasad of Lord Jagannath are distributed amongst the devotees near the Ratnavedi inside the frame of Phokaria, which is being drawn by the Puja pandas using Muruj, except for the Gopal Ballav Bhog and Bhog Mandap Bhoga which are distributed in the Anabsar Pindi & Bhoga Mandap respectively.

Rosaghara

The temple's kitchen is the largest in the world. Tradition holds that all Mahaprasad cooking in the temple kitchens is supervised by the Goddess Mahalakshmi, the empress of Srimandir herself, and that if the food prepared has any fault in it, a shadow dog appears near the temple kitchen, a sign of her displeasure. If the shadow dog is seen, the food is promptly buried and a new batch cooked. All 56 varieties of food produced are vegetarian and prepared without onions, garlic, as prescribed by Hindu religious texts. Cooking is done only in earthen pots using water drawn from two special wells near the kitchen called Ganga and Yamuna. The most awaited offering is Kotho Bhoga or Abadha, offered after midday. After being offered to Jagannath and the other deities, the food is sold at Ananda Bajara, an open food market inside the temple.

Festivals

There are elaborate daily worship services. There are many festivals each year attended by millions of people. The most important festival is the Rath Yatra or the Chariot festival in June. This spectacular festival includes a procession of three huge chariots bearing the deities of Jagannath, Balabhadra and Subhadra through the Bada Danda meaning the Grand Avenue of Puri until their final destination the Gundicha Temple.

Early European observers told tales of devotees being crushed under the wheels of these chariots, whether by accident or even as a form of meritorious suicide akin to suttee.  These reports gave rise to the loan word juggernaut suggesting something immense and unstoppable. Many festivals like Dol Yatra in spring and Jhulan Yatra in monsoon are celebrated by temple every year. Pavitrotsava and Damanaka utsava are celebrated as per panchanga or panjika. There are special ceremonies in the month of Kartika and Pausha.

The annual shodasha dinatmaka or 16-day puja beginning 8 days prior to Mahalaya of Ashwin month for Goddess Vimala and ending on Vijayadashami, is of great importance, in which both the utsava murty of lord Madanmohan and Vimala take part.
 Pana Sankranti: Also known or Vishuva Sankranti and Mesha Sankranti: Special rituals are performed at the temple.

Chandan Yatra

In Akshaya Tritiya every year the Chandan Yatra festival marks the commencement of the construction of the Chariots of the Rath Yatra.

Snnana Yatra
On the Purnima of the month of Jyestha the Gods are ceremonially bathed and decorated every year on the occasion of Snana Yatra.

Anavasara or Anasara

Literally means vacation. Every year, the main deities of Jagannath, Balabhadra, Subhadra & Sudarshan after the holy Snana Yatra on the jyestha purnima, go to a secret altar named Anavasara Ghar where they remain for the next dark fortnight (Krishna paksha). Hence devotees are not allowed to view them. So devotees worship at the nearby Brahmagiri temple of Alarnath, an icon of a four-handed Vishnu as a manifestation of Jagannath. Devotees get the first glimpse of the devotees on the day before Rath Yatra, which is called Navayouvana. It is said that the deities fall in fever after taking a huge bath and they are treated by the special servants named, Daitapatis for 15 days. During this period cooked food is not offered to the deities.

Rath Yatra at Puri

The Jagannath triad are usually worshiped in the sanctum of the temple at Puri, but once during the month of Asadha (Rainy Season of Orissa, usually falling in month of June or July), they are brought out onto the Bada Danda (main street of Puri) and travel (3 km) to the Shri Gundicha Temple, in huge chariots (ratha), allowing the public to have darśana (Holy view). This festival is known as Rath Yatra, meaning the journey (yatra) of the chariots (ratha). The Rathas are huge wheeled wooden structures, which are built anew every year and are pulled by the devotees. The chariot for Jagannath is approximately 45 feet high and 35 feet square and takes about 2 months to construct. The artists and painters of Puri decorate the cars and paint flower petals and other designs on the wheels, the wood-carved charioteer and horses, and the inverted lotuses on the wall behind the throne. The huge chariots of Jagannath pulled during Rath Yatra is the etymological origin of the English word Juggernaut. The Ratha-Yatra is also termed as the Shri Gundicha yatra.

The most significant ritual associated with the Ratha-Yatra is the chhera pahara. During the festival, the Gajapati King wears the outfit of a sweeper and sweeps all around the deities and chariots in the Chera Pahara (sweeping with water) ritual. The Gajapati King cleanses the road before the chariots with a gold-handled broom and sprinkles sandalwood water and powder with utmost devotion.  As per the custom, although the Gajapati King has been considered the most exalted person in the Kalingan kingdom, he still renders the menial service to Jagannath. This ritual signified that under the lordship of Jagannath, there is no distinction between the powerful sovereign Gajapati King and the most humble devotee. Chera pahara is held on two days, on the first day of the Ratha Yatra, when the deities are taken to garden house at Mausi Maa Temple and again on the last day of the festival, when the deities are ceremoniously brought back to the Shri Mandir.

As per another ritual, when the deities are taken out from the Shri Mandir to the Chariots in Pahandi vijay.

In the Ratha Yatra, the three deities are taken from the Jagannath Temple in the chariots to the Gundicha Temple, where they stay for nine days. Thereafter, the deities again ride the chariots back to Shri Mandir in bahuda yatra. On the way back, the three chariots halt at the Mausi Maa Temple and the deities are offered Poda Pitha, a kind of baked cake which are generally consumed by the Odisha people only.

The observance of the Rath Yatra of Jagannath dates back to the period of the Puranas. Vivid descriptions of this festival are found in Brahma Purana, Padma Purana, and Skanda Purana. Kapila Samhita also refers to Rath Yatra. In Moghul period also, King Ramsingh of Jaipur, Rajasthan has been described as organizing the Rath Yatra in the 18th century. In Orissa, Kings of Mayurbhanj and Parlakhemundi were organizing the Rath Yatra, though the most grand festival in terms of scale and popularity takes place at Puri.

Moreover, Starza notes that the ruling Ganga dynasty instituted the Rath Yatra at the completion of the great temple around 1150 AD. This festival was one of those Hindu festivals that was reported to the Western world very early. Friar Odoric of Pordenone visited India in 1316–1318, some 20 years after Marco Polo had dictated the account of his travels while in a Genoese prison. In his own account of 1321, Odoric reported how the people put the deities on chariots, and the King and Queen and all the people drew them from the "church" with song and music.

Niladri Bije
Celebrated on Asadha Trayodashi. Niladri Bije is the concluding day of Ratha yatra. On this day deities return to the ratna bedi. Lord Jagannath offers Rasgulla to Goddess Laxmi to enter into the temple.

Gupta Gundicha
Celebrated for 16 days from Ashwina Krushna dwitiya to Vijayadashami. As per tradition, the deity of Madhaba, along with the deity  of Goddess Durga (known as Durgamadhaba), is taken on a tour of the temple premises. The tour within the temple is observed for the first eight days. For the next eight days, the deities are taken outside the temple on a palanquin to the nearby Narayani temple situated in the Dolamandapa lane. After their worship, they are brought back to the temple.

Nabakalebara

Nabakalabera is a ritual associated with Jagannath which takes place every 8, 12 or 19 years, when one lunar month of Ashadha is followed by another lunar month of Aashadha. Meaning "New Body", the ritual involves installation of new images in the Jagannath Temple and the burial of the old images at the temple at Koili Vaikuntha. The festival is witnessed by as millions of people and its budget exceeds $500,000. More than three million devotees were expected to visit the temple during the Nabakalevara in 2015, making it one of the most visited festivals in the world.

Management
After independence, the State Government, with a view to getting better administrative system, passed "The Puri Shri Jagannath Temple (Administration) Act, 1952". It contained provisions to prepare the Record of Rights and duties of Sevayats and such other persons connected with the system of worship and management of the temple. Subsequently Shri Jagannath Temple Act, 1955 was enacted to reorganize the management system of the affair of the temple and its properties.

Dibyasingha Deb is the "adhyasevak" (chief servitor) of the temple. He took the role in 1970 at the age of 17, after the death of his father, Birakishore Deb, then the Maharaja of Puri.

Security
The security at the temple has increased ahead of Ratha Yatra, the homecoming festival of the deities of Jagannath temple. In the wake of terror alert on 27 June 2012, the security forces were increased to ensure smooth functioning of the crowded Ratha Yatra and Suna Besha.

See also
 Chari Kshetra
 Shivala Teja Singh temple

References

Bibliography

External links

 Puruṣottama-kṣetra-māhātmya, Skanda Purana
 
 Lord Sri Jagannath Temple  –  Jagannath Dharma (Official website of the Puri district administration)
 Street View around Jagannath Temple

Jagannath Temple Complex
Char Dham temples
Temples dedicated to Jagannath
Krishna temples
Vishnu temples
Purana temples of Vishnu
Archaeological monuments in Odisha
Hindu pilgrimage sites in India
Puri
Vaishnavism